Kahit Nasaan Ka Man (International title: Love Sonata  / ) is a 2013 Philippine television drama romance series broadcast by GMA Network. Directed by Gil Tejada Jr., it stars Julie Anne San Jose and Kristofer Martin. It premiered on September 23, 2013 on the network's Telebabad line up replacing Anna Karenina. The series concluded on November 15, 2013 with a total of 40 episodes. It was replaced by Adarna in its timeslot.

Cast and characters

Lead cast
 Julie Anne San Jose as Pauline Gomez
 Kristofer Martin as Leandro de Chavez

Supporting cast
 Eula Valdez as Theresa de Chavez
 Rita Avila as Delia
 Ronaldo Valdez as Tino Gomez
 Tessie Tomas as Corazon
 Yayo Aguila as Medel
 Michael de Mesa as Ernesto Gomez
 Arthur Solinap as Luis Castillo
 Vaness del Moral as Sally Castillo-Gomez
 Lucho Ayala as John
 Ervic Vijandre as Benjo

Guest cast
 Miggs Cuaderno as young Leandro
 Roseanne Magan as young Pauline
 Rio Locsin as Pauline's mother
 Epi Quizon as Paulo de Chavez
 Franco Laurel as Medina
 Djanin Cruz as Amy
 Camille Prats as a TV host

Production
Actor Ricky Davao was initially cast in the series, for the role of Ernesto Gomez. The role later went to Michael de Mesa.

Ratings
According to AGB Nielsen Philippines' Mega Manila household television ratings, the pilot episode of Kahit Nasaan Ka Man earned a 24.1% rating. While the final episode scored a 20.2% rating.

Accolades

References

External links
 

2013 Philippine television series debuts
2013 Philippine television series endings
Filipino-language television shows
GMA Network drama series
Philippine musical television series
Philippine romance television series
Television shows set in the Philippines